Eastern Uusimaa or, officially, Itä-Uusimaa (literally "Eastern New Land") was one of the 19 regions of Finland, until it consolidated with the region of Uusimaa on January 1, 2011. It bordered the regions of Uusimaa, Päijänne Tavastia (Päijät-Häme) and Kymenlaakso.

Historical provinces

Municipalities 

The region of Eastern Uusimaa was made up of seven municipalities, of which two had city status (marked in bold). Finnish names of the various municipalities are given in brackets next to the English-usage name.

Loviisa Sub-region:
 Lapinjärvi (Lappträsk)
 Loviisa (Lovisa)

Porvoo Sub-region:
 Askola
 Myrskylä (Mörskom)
 Porvoo (Borgå)
 Pukkila
 Sipoo (Sibbo)*

* - transferred to the Helsinki sub-region of the Uusimaa region on 1 January 2011

References

External links 

 Eastern Uusimaa Regional Council

Southern Finland Province
Uusimaa, Eastern
States and territories disestablished in 2011